The 1935 Perth by-election was held on 16 April 1935.  The by-election was held due to the succession to the peerage of the incumbent Liberal National MP, Mungo Murray.  It was won by the Liberal National candidate Francis Norie-Miller.

Norie-Miller contested Perth as a Liberal at the 1931 general election. The Liberal Party, led by Sir Herbert Samuel had agreed to support the National Government of Ramsay MacDonald at the 1931 general election, with some reservations over the traditional Liberal policy of free trade and Norie-Miller fought the election publicly supporting the government . However the Conservatives also supported the National Government and neither party therefore had a clear advantage with the electorate in terms of identification with the National Government.

Norie-Miller then stood down as prospective Liberal candidate for Perth and in 1934 the local Liberal Association selected James Scott, the former Liberal MP for Kincardine and Aberdeenshire West as their new representative. In 1935, when Lord Scone succeeded his father as Earl of Mansfield and Mansfield and went to the House of Lords, a by-election was called for Perth. However, instead of adopting James Scott as their Parliamentary candidate, the Perth Liberals invited Norie-Miller to fight the election as they learned that Perth Conservatives were willing not to oppose him at the by-election providing he stood as a National candidate. Scott was known as a strong supporter of Free Trade  whereas Norie-Miller favoured tariffs and protectionism. In a straight fight with the Labour candidate the former MP Adam McKinley, Norie-Miller won the by-election on 16 April 1935 by a majority of 9,532.

Norie-Miller decided not to contest the 1935 general election in November that year.

References

1935 elections in the United Kingdom
1935 in Scotland
1930s elections in Scotland
Politics of Perth and Kinross
Politics of Perth, Scotland
By-elections to the Parliament of the United Kingdom in Scottish constituencies
April 1935 events